Wilder is a city in Jackson County, Minnesota, United States. The population was 60 at the 2010 census.

History
Wilder was founded in 1885. It was named for Amherst Holcomb Wilder, a railroad official. Wilder was incorporated as a city in 1899. A post office was established in Wilder in 1886, and remained in operation until it was discontinued in 1991.

Geography

Minnesota State Highways 60 and 86 are two of the main routes in the community.

Demographics

2010 census
As of the census of 2010, there were 60 people, 25 households, and 16 families residing in the city. The racial makeup of the city was 100.0% White.

There were 25 households, of which 24.0% had children under the age of 18 living with them, 48.0% were married couples living together, 8.0% had a female householder with no husband present, 8.0% had a male householder with no wife present, and 36.0% were non-families. 32.0% of all households were made up of individuals, and 16% had someone living alone who was 65 years of age or older. The average household size was 2.40 and the average family size was 3.00.

The median age in the city was 38 years. 28.3% of residents were under the age of 18; 0.1% were between the ages of 18 and 24; 25% were from 25 to 44; 28.4% were from 45 to 64; and 18.3% were 65 years of age or older. The gender makeup of the city was 56.7% male and 43.3% female.

2000 census
As of the census of 2000, there were 69 people, 29 households, and 20 families residing in the city. The racial makeup of the city was 100.00% White.

There were 29 households, out of which 27.6% had children under the age of 18 living with them, 51.7% were married couples living together, 10.3% had a female householder with no husband present, and 31.0% were non-families. 20.7% of all households were made up of individuals, and 10.3% had someone living alone who was 65 years of age or older. The average household size was 2.38 and the average family size was 2.70.

In the city, the population was spread out, with 18.8% under the age of 18, 13.0% from 18 to 24, 18.8% from 25 to 44, 34.8% from 45 to 64, and 14.5% who were 65 years of age or older. The median age was 44 years. For every 100 females, there were 109.1 males. For every 100 females age 18 and over, there were 124.0 males.

The median income for a household in the city was $41,875, and the median income for a family was $41,563. Males had a median income of $27,143 versus $18,438 for females. The per capita income for the city was $14,222. There were 7.4% of families and 11.8% of the population living below the poverty line, including 15.8% of under eighteens and none of those over 64.

Politics
Wilder is located in Minnesota's 1st congressional district, represented by Republican Jim Hagedorn.  At the state level, Wilder is located in Senate District 22, represented by Republican Doug Magnus, and in House District 22B, represented by Republican Rod Hamilton.

References

Cities in Jackson County, Minnesota
Cities in Minnesota